Tunisia national football team has won five official titles and eight friendly titles, including international friendly tournaments organized by the Tunisian team, such as the 7th November Cup and the 2003 Tunis Four Nations Tournament.

The most prominent title remains the 2004 African Cup of Nations and the 2011 African Nations Championship, as well as the gold medal At the 2001 Mediterranean Games, the 1963 Arab Nations Cup and the 1973 Palestine Cup of Nations.

Compititions

African competitions

Arab competitions

Mediterranean competitions

Minior compititions

References 

Tunisia national football team